Cuvânt Moldovenesc (English: The Moldovan Word) may refer to: 

 Cuvânt Moldovenesc (newspaper), a newspaper from Chişinău (1914–1920) 
 Cuvânt Moldovenesc (magazine), a magazine from Chişinău (1913–1917)